DOS 286 or DOS/286 may refer to:

Concurrent DOS 286, a Digital Research CP/M- and DOS-compatible multiuser multitasking operating system variant since 1985
FlexOS 286, a Digital Research FlexOS operating system variant since 1986
OS/2 1.0, an IBM and Microsoft operating system and then-times supposed-to-be successor of MS-DOS/PC DOS since 1987

See also
DOS 2 (disambiguation)
DOS 5 (disambiguation)
DOS 386 (disambiguation)
DOS (disambiguation)